QB1: Beyond the Lights is a 2017 American documentary web television TV series directed by Peter Berg. Each season focuses on three high school senior quarterbacks from different backgrounds as they play their final season before moving on to NCAA Division I college football. It started out as a go90 series then was moved to Netflix but has subsequently been removed.

The first season was released on February 13, 2017 on Netflix. Season 2 premiered on February 28, 2018, whilst Season 3 was released on August 16, 2019 most likely due to Spencer Rattler's suspension from his football team.

Cast

Season 1
 Tayvon Bowers – Committed to the Wake Forest Demon Deacons, subsequently transferred to the Gardner–Webb Runnin' Bulldogs.
 Jake Fromm – Committed to the Georgia Bulldogs. Fromm was subsequently drafted by the Buffalo Bills in the fifth round of the 2020 NFL Draft.
 Tate Martell – Committed to the Ohio State Buckeyes, subsequently transferred to the Miami Hurricanes and later to UNLV.

Season 2
 Justin Fields – Committed to the Georgia Bulldogs, subsequently transferred to the Ohio State Buckeyes. Fields was drafted by the Chicago Bears in the first round of the 2021 NFL Draft.
 Sam Hartman – Committed to the Wake Forest Demon Deacons.
 Re-al Mitchell– Committed to the Iowa State Cyclones, subsequently transferred to the Temple Owls and later to San Diego.

Season 3
 Lance  Legendre – Committed to the Maryland Terrapins, subsequently transferred to the Louisiana Ragin' Cajuns.
 Spencer Rattler – Committed to the Oklahoma Sooners, subsequently transferred to the South Carolina Gamecocks.
 Nik Scalzo – Committed to the Kentucky Wildcats, subsequently transferred to the Samford Bulldogs.

Connections
In January, 2019, season 2 subject Justin Fields announced his intention to transfer from Georgia to Ohio State. Season 1 subject Tate Martell – then at Ohio State – tweeted, "Word of advice: don't swing and miss...especially not your second time." Even prior to this, on December 30, 2018, upon word that Fields was giving thought to transferring to Georgia Tech, Martell made it clear that he had no plans to depart, stating, "Why would I leave for someone who hasn’t put in a single second into this program? To just run away from somebody who hasn’t put a single second into workouts anything like that and doesn’t know what the program is all about, there’s not a chance. I will [be the starting quarterback]. I am 100 percent sure on that. I am not just going to walk away from something that I have put so much time into and there is not a chance that I won’t go out there and compete for that." Less than two weeks later, on January 10, Martell chose to enter the NCAA transfer portal, eventually moving to Miami (FL).

Martell and Fields aren't the only subjects to play at the same school. In fact, three colleges have had multiple players from QB1:

Georgia: Jake Fromm (2017–19), Justin Fields (2018)
Ohio State: Tate Martell (2017–18), Justin Fields (2019–2020)
Wake Forest: Tayvon Bowers (2017–18), Sam Hartman (2018–2022)

Future success
Appearing in Season 1, Fromm has seen significant college football success. Fromm was the first to make a College Football Playoff game with Martell's Buckeyes also making a New Year’s Six game that season, the Cotton Bowl in December 2017 (but Martell not appearing) and Fromm starting at QB for Georgia in the 2018 Rose Bowl three days later. Fromm also started the CFP National Championship Game. He was taken with the 167th pick in the fifth round of the 2020 NFL Draft by the Buffalo Bills.

Justin Fields is the first to merit Heisman Trophy consideration, finishing third in 2019. He was drafted 11th overall by the Chicago Bears in the 2021 NFL Draft.

Episodes

Season 1 (2017)

Season 2 (2018)

Season 3 (2019)

References

External links
 
 

English-language Netflix original programming
2010s American documentary television series
2010s American high school television series
2017 American television series debuts
2019 American television series endings
Netflix original documentary television series
Documentary television series about sports
Television series about teenagers